Konstantin Kravchuk won the singles title at the 2016 Busan Open tennis tournament after defeating Daniel Evans 6–4, 6–4 in the final.

Chung Hyeon was the defending champion but lost in the first round to Kravchuk.

Seeds

Draw

Finals

Top half

Bottom half

References

External links
Main draw
Qualifying draw

Busan Open - Singles